This is a list of members of the Argentine Chamber of Deputies from 10 December 2017 to 9 December 2019.

Composition

By province

By political groups

Election cycles

List of Deputies 

The table is sorted by provinces in alphabetical order, and then with their deputies in alphabetical order by their surnames. All deputies start their term on December 10, and end it on December 9 of the corresponding years, except when noted.

Notes

External links
Official site 

2017
2017 in Argentina
2018 in Argentina